Yohan Bocognano (born 16 June 1990) is a French professional footballer who plays as a defender for US Corte and the Corsica national team.

Career
Bocognano was born in Ajaccio.

In January 2014, Bocognano signed for Inter Baku in the Azerbaijan Premier League. In June 2015, Bocognano moved to Romania, signing a two-year contract with FC Petrolul Ploiești.

In 2018, he signed a two-year contract with SC Bastia where he stayed up until 2022 having won promotion in French Ligue 2. 

In 2022, after he was told to leave SC Bastia after his contract expired, he signed for a second time for Gazélec Ajaccio in Championnat National 3.

Career statistics

References

External links
 

Living people
1990 births
Association football defenders
Corsica international footballers
French footballers
Ligue 2 players
Championnat National players
Championnat National 2 players
Championnat National 3 players
Azerbaijan Premier League players
Challenger Pro League players
Nîmes Olympique players
Gazélec Ajaccio players
FC Istres players
A.F.C. Tubize players
FC Mulhouse players
Shamakhi FK players
FC Petrolul Ploiești players
FC Bastia-Borgo players
SC Bastia players
French expatriate footballers
French expatriate sportspeople in Azerbaijan
Expatriate footballers in Azerbaijan
French expatriate sportspeople in Romania
Expatriate footballers in Romania
French expatriate sportspeople in Belgium
Expatriate footballers in Belgium
Footballers from Corsica